The R-29RM Shtil (Russian: Штиль, lit. "Calmness", NATO reporting name SS-N-23 Skiff) was a liquid propellant, submarine-launched ballistic missile in use by the Russian Navy. It had the alternate Russian designations RSM-54 and GRAU index 3M27. It was designed to be launched from the Delta IV submarine, each of which is capable of carrying 16 missiles. They were replaced with the newer R-29RMU2 Sineva and later with the enhanced variant R-29RMU2.1 Layner.

History

Development
Development of the R-29RM started in 1979 at the Makeyev Rocket Design Bureau. The navy accepted the armament in 1986 and subsequently installed the D-9RM launch system consisting of a cluster of 16 R-29RM onboard the nuclear-propelled Project 667BDRM submarines.

Operation Behemoth

On 6 August 1991 at 21:09, K-407 , under the command of Captain Second Rank Sergey Yegorov, became the world's only submarine to successfully launch an all-missile salvo, launching 16 R-29RM (RSM-54) ballistic missiles of total weight of almost 700 tons in 244 seconds (operation code name "Behemoth-2"). All the missile hit their designated targets at the Kura Missile Test Range in Kamchatka.

Space Launch Vehicle
Several R-29RM were retrofitted as Shtill carrier rockets to be launched by Delta-class submarines, the submarines being mobile can send a payload directly into a heliosynchronic orbit, notably used by imaging satellites. Outside the confines of the Russian military, this capability has been used commercially to place three out of four microsatellites into a low Earth orbit with one cancellation assigned to the Baikonur Cosmodrome for better financial terms.

End of service
The last boat carrying R-29RM,  K-51 , went into refit to be rearmed with the newer R-29RMU Sineva on 23 August 2010.

Operators

Former operators
 
 Russian Navy (1992-2010)
 
 Soviet Navy (1986-1991)

See also
 R-29 Vysota
 R-29RMU Sineva
 R-29RMU2 Layner
 RSM-56 Bulava
 Kanyon
 UGM-133 Trident II
 M45 (missile)
 M51 (missile)
 JL-1
 JL-2
 K Missile family
 Pukkuksong-1
 R-39 Rif
 R-39M

References

External links
CSIS Missile Threat SS-N-23
IDB RSM-54 (R-29RM) 3M37, SS-N-23 "Skiff" (Russian)
Russian nuclear delivery systems at the Center for Defense Information

Submarine-launched ballistic missiles of Russia
Cold War submarine-launched ballistic missiles of the Soviet Union
Makeyev Rocket Design Bureau
Military equipment introduced in the 1980s

de:R-29#R-29RM